Rodrigo "Comprido" Medeiros (born January 11, 1977) is a Brazilian jiu-jitsu black belt and submission grappler. Medeiros is a two-time openweight World Jiu-Jitsu Champion. Medeiros has been a Jiu-Jitsu instructor to many notable mixed martial arts fighters such as former UFC Heavyweight Champion Brock Lesnar, former Bellator Heavyweight Champions Cole Konrad, Pat Barry, and Chris Tuchscherer.

Biography

Comprido is one of the founding members of Team Brasa. Comprido appeared on the instructional DVD The Science of Jiu-Jitsu II with Demian Maia.

Comprido is often confused with the Carlson Gracie Sr Black Belt leader of the BJJ Revolution team Rodrigo Medeiros.

He currently resides in the Chicago area and owns and teaches at Comprido BJJ, a Brasa school, in Bloomingdale, Illinois.

Comprido founded the Brasa Jiu Jitsu camp in Buzios, Rio de Janeiro along with friend and student Felipe Costa.

Comprido has been one of the first elite Brazilian jiu-jitsu competitors to speak out against the widespread use of steroids at the top level of the sport.

On August 9, 2014, Comprido fought Saulo Ribeiro in a grappling match in Metamoris IV.  The fight ended in a draw.

Comprido earned the first ever submission in an IBJJF absolute black belt match when he defeated Roberto "Roleta" Magalhaes in the 1999 World Championships Finals. The 18-second fight is also the fastest submission in a black belt world championship final.

Comprido earned seven Brazilian jiu-jitsu world titles - 4 in the IBJJF and 3 in the CBJJO - between 1999 and 2006.

In 2006, he began training UFC fighter Brock Lesnar and opened his own academy in 2011 under Lesnar's encouragement. It was at that time he became a spokesman for Greatmats, an online retailer of martial arts mats.

Comprido has trained several world champions including Lesnar (UFC Heavyweight), Maia (ADCC), Cole Konrad (Bellator Heavyweight), Caio Terra (IBJJF), Roberto Traven (IBJJF), Felipe Costa (IBJJF), Dean Lister (ADCC) and Jessica Buchman (IBJJF). 
Daniel Taylor
(World Tae Kwon Do Federation)

Instructor Lineage
Mitsuyo 'Count Koma' Maeda → Carlos Gracie, Sr. → Helio Gracie → Rolls Gracie → Romero Cavalcanti → Rodrigo 'Comprido' Mederios

Championships and accomplishments

CBJJ World Championships

2007
Black Belt -97 kg: 3rd place

2006
Black Belt -97 kg: 3rd place

2005
Black Belt -97 kg: 3rd place

2004
Black Belt -97 kg: 2nd Place

2003
Black Belt -91 kg: 3rd place

2001
Black Belt Open Weight: 3rd place
Black Belt -91 kg: 2nd place

2000
Black Belt -97 kg: 3rd place
Black Belt Open Weight: 1st Place

1999
Black Belt Open Weight: 1st Place

CBJJ Pan American Championships
2007
Black Belt +97 kg: 1st place

2004
Black Belt -91 kg: 2nd place

2002
Black Belt -97 kg: 2nd place

CBJJO Copa do Mundo Championships

2006
Black Belt -97 kg: 1st place

2003
Black Belt -91 kg: 2nd place

2002
Black Belt -91 kg: 1st place

References

External links
Tournament Results - Official Homepages
 CBJJ Tournament Results

1977 births
Living people
Brazilian practitioners of Brazilian jiu-jitsu
Sportspeople from Brasília
People awarded a black belt in Brazilian jiu-jitsu